The 1995–96 Czech First League was the third season of top-tier football in the Czech Republic.

League changes

Relegated to the 1995–96 Czech 2. Liga
 Bohemians Prague
 Benešov

Promoted from the 1994–95 Czech 2. Liga
 Opava
 Uherské Hradiště

Stadia and locations

League table

Results

Top goalscorers

See also
 1995–96 Czech Cup
 1995–96 Czech 2. Liga

References

  ČMFS statistics

Czech First League seasons
Czech
1995–96 in Czech football